K-1 World Grand Prix 2001 Final was a kickboxing event promoted by the K-1. The event was held at the Tokyo Dome in Tokyo, Japan on Saturday, December 8, 2001, in front of 65,000 spectators. It was the ninth K-1 Grand Prix final, involving eight of the world's top fighters, with all bouts fought under K-1 Rules (100 kg/156-220 lbs). The eight finalists had almost all qualified by winning preliminary tournaments (with the exception of Peter Aerts who was a runner up), while two additional fighters were invited as reserve fighters in case of any injuries (for more detail on this see bulleted list below).

As well as tournament bouts there was also the aforementioned 'Reserve Fight' to decide who would be a replacement for any injured competition fighters, fought under K-1 Rules, and a 'Super Fight' between local middleweight star Masato and Noel Soares, fought under K-1 MAX Rules (70 kg/152 lbs).  In total there were twelve fighters at the event, representing eleven countries. 

The tournament winner was Mark Hunt who defeated Francisco Filho in the final by extra round unanimous decision, for his first and so far only K-1 World Grand Prix final victory.  Both him and Francisco Filho even reaching the final was seen as a huge upset, helped in part by all the competition favourites Ernesto Hoost, Jérôme Le Banner and Peter Aerts being knocked out at the Quarter Final stage.     

Qualifiers - Finalists
Peter Aerts - K-1 World Grand Prix 2001 in Las Vegas runner up
Jérôme Le Banner - K-1 World Grand Prix 2001 in Osaka winner
Francisco Filho - K-1 World Grand Prix 2001 in Fukuoka Repechage A winner
Ernesto Hoost - K-1 World Grand Prix 2001 in Melbourne winner
Mark Hunt - K-1 World Grand Prix 2001 in Fukuoka Repechage B winner
Alexey Ignashov - K-1 World Grand Prix 2001 in Nagoya winner
Stefan Leko - K-1 World Grand Prix 2001 in Las Vegas winner
Nicholas Pettas - K-1 Andy Memorial 2001 Japan GP Final winner

Qualifiers - Reservists
Mike Bernardo - K-1 World Grand Prix 2001 in Fukuoka Repechage B semi finalist
Adam Watt - K-1 World Grand Prix 2001 in Fukuoka Repechage B runner up

K-1 World Grand Prix 2001 Final Tournament

* Ernesto Hoost was injured after his match with Stefan Leko. As the Reserve Fight winner Mike Bernardo was also injured, Stefan Leko would take his place in the Semi Finals

Results

See also
List of K-1 events
List of K-1 champions
List of male kickboxers

References

External links
K-1 Official Website
K-1sport.de - Your Source for Everything K-1

K-1 events
2001 in kickboxing
Kickboxing in Japan
Sports competitions in Tokyo